Leptodeuterocopus neales is a moth of the family Pterophoridae that is known from Costa Rica, Ecuador, Guatemala, Mexico, Suriname, Paraguay, Peru and Venezuela. It has recently been recorded from Florida.

Adults are on wing in April, May, August, September, October, November and December.

References

External links

Leptodeuterocopus neales: A New Record for Florida and the United States (Lepidoptera: Pterophoridae: Deuterocopinae)

Deuterocopinae
Moths described in 1915